The first Persian envoy to Denmark arrived in 1691 in order to negotiate the release of the Iranian-owned cargo of a Bengali ship seized by the Danish fleet. The Iranian diplomat had been issued with diplomatic credentials by Suleiman I of Persia (Shah 1666-1694) and opened negotiations with King Christian V of Denmark. He was unable to secure the release of the cargo.

History
In 1933, a Danish consulate was established in Tehran which was later upgraded to an embassy.

Also in 1933, with the arrival of Danish engineers in Iran, technical cooperation commenced. In the same year a contract was signed with the Danish engineering firm of Kampsax A/S to construct the trans-Iranian railway line. Five years later, on 25 August 1938, with the opening of the North- South railway line the Iranian desire of connecting the North to the South by rail came true.

Following a state visit in 1958, Iran established an embassy in Copenhagen. More specifically, the mission in Copenhagen was launched on 19 February 1959 and Ali Asghar Nase was appointed Iranian ambassador.

The 2006 Muhammad cartoons controversy saw the Danish embassy to Iran attacked by protesters and the Iranian Ambassador to Denmark called to Tehran; thus straining political and economic interaction between the two countries.

On 30 October 2018, the Danish Security and Intelligence Service (DSIS) announced that they suspect Iranian Intelligence agencies was operating in Denmark, and that they were planning to kill the leader of ASMLA, who lives there. Denmark responded by recalling their ambassador in Tehran.

External links
 Agreement on a Danish Government loan to Iran (with annex and exchange of notes). Signed at Copenhagen, on 2 November 1967
 Protocol on economic, industrial, scientific and technical co-operation. Signed at Copenhagen on 4 December 1974
 Encyclopædia Iranica on Iran-Denmark historical relations
 Denmark, Iran Near War Over Pastry Naming Rights
 EU criticizes Iran's trade boycott on Denmark
 Iran, Denmark Co-op in Catalyst Production
 Danish companies in Iran

See also
 Foreign relations of Denmark
 Foreign relations of Iran

References

 
Iran
Bilateral relations of Iran